Lestes patricia is a species of damselfly in the family Lestidae. It is native to Western Ghats in India.

Fraser described this species from a single male specimen collected from Kodagu district of Karnataka. In 2020, A colony was rediscovered in the Satara district of Maharashtra and specimens are deposited at Bombay Natural History Society for further studies.

Description and habitat
It is a medium sized damselfly with blue eyes. Thorax is bluish green on dorsum, changing to greenish white on the sides. The dorsum of thorax is marked with a pair of broad ante-humeral black stripes with straight borders. There are two pairs of tiny black spots on the lateral sides. Its abdomen is pale bluish green, marked with black. Anal appendages are black. This species can be easily distinguished from other Indian Lestes species by the single mid-dorsal black band with straight borders.

See also
 List of odonates of India
 List of odonata of Kerala

References

External links

Lestes
Odonata of Asia
Insects of India
Insects described in 1924
Taxa named by Frederic Charles Fraser